The Jefferson Avenue Historic District was formed in 1998 and encompasses all structures between 25th and 27th streets on Jefferson Avenue in Ogden, Utah, United States.

Description
Historically, the Jefferson Avenue area between 25th and 27th Streets was home to many wealthy Ogden residents. Many homes were built in a distinct Victorian style that also permeated the surrounding area. Owners included J.C. Armstrong/David Eccles, Hiram H. Spencer/William Eccles, David C. Eccles, Isadore Marks/Adam Patterson Sr., William Wattis, Louis Moench, Thomas Jordan Stevens, William V. Helfrich and Edmund T. Hulaniski.

As the children of the district grew up, many moved to newer homes in the Eccles Avenue Historic District to the east, which used primarily Prairie style architecture over the Victorian style.

Ogden grew significantly from 1910–1950, and the industrial center of the city moved toward the district. This led to its eventual decline as a prime residential area.  Unfortunately, many of the homes on the 2600 block of Jefferson Avenue were demolished.  During the 1960s through the 1990s, most of the homes were converted to lower-income multi-family residences. Currently, almost all have been reverted to single-family dwellings. This has restored much of the elegant style to the neighborhood.

See also

 National Register of Historic Places listings in Weber County, Utah

References

External links

1998 establishments in Utah
Buildings and structures in Ogden, Utah
Historic districts on the National Register of Historic Places in Utah
National Register of Historic Places in Weber County, Utah
Individually listed contributing properties to historic districts on the National Register in Utah